Dušan "Duško" Ajder (born 6 December 1958) is a retired Serbian professional footballer who played as a central defender.

Born in Belgrade, SR Serbia, he played for Belgrade clubs Red Star and FK Rad in the Yugoslav First League before moving abroad, first to Turkey, to play with Ankaragücü and then to Portugal to play with Leça.

References

External links
Yugoslavia stats at Zerodic

1958 births
Living people
Footballers from Belgrade
Serbian footballers
Yugoslav footballers
Association football defenders
Yugoslav First League players
Red Star Belgrade footballers
FK Rad players
Süper Lig players
MKE Ankaragücü footballers
Leça F.C. players
Serbian expatriate footballers
Expatriate footballers in Turkey
Expatriate footballers in Portugal
Serbian expatriate sportspeople in Turkey